Osman Hassan (born 27 January 1952) is an Egyptian basketball player. He competed in the men's tournament at the 1976 Summer Olympics.

References

1952 births
Living people
Egyptian men's basketball players
Olympic basketball players of Egypt
Basketball players at the 1976 Summer Olympics
Place of birth missing (living people)